Antonina Rudenko (born 28 May 1950) is a retired Soviet swimmer who won a gold medal in the 4×100 m freestyle relay at the 1966 European Aquatics Championships, setting a new European record. She also won a silver medal in the 4×100 m medley relay at the same championships.

References

External links
Profile at Infosport.ru 

1950 births
Living people
People from Yalta
Russian female freestyle swimmers
Soviet female freestyle swimmers
European Aquatics Championships medalists in swimming
Spartak athletes